Peggy Hoffmann is an American writer of over 70 romance novels since 1993 as Kate Hoffmann. She has written for both the Temptation and Blaze lines for Harlequin Books. In 1992 she won the Harlequin Temptation contest. She lives in southeastern Wisconsin.

Biography
Hoffmann majored in music in college, later she settled into a job teaching music to elementary school children. After she left teaching, she had jobs in fashion merchandising, advertising, public relations and marketing/communications on both the agency and corporate side.  She began reading romantic novels in 1979, when she picked up a copy of Ashes in the Wind by Kathleen E. Woodiwiss, after which she immediately read all by Kathleen E. Woodiwiss, Rosemary Rogers, Laurie McBain, Valerie Sherwood, Johanna Lindsey and Jennifer Blake.

She attempted writing historical novels but eventually turned to contemporary novels instead. Her first contemporary novel was published in 1993 under the pseudonym "Kate Hoffmann."

Bibliography

Standalone novels
Indecent Exposure (1993)
Wanted: Wife (1993)
Love Potion No 9 (1994)
Lady of the Night (1994)
Never Love a Cowboy (1995)
Wicked Ways (1996)
The Honeymoon Deal (1997)
All Through the Night (2000)
Mr. Right Now (2001)
Unexpected Angel (2002)
Legally Mine (2004)
Ring of Deception (2004)
Hot & Bothered (2004)
Warm & Willing (2004)
Incognito (2008)
Her Irish Rogue (2008)
Into The Night (2011)
Sweet Revenge? (2011)
Off Limits Marine (2017)

Series

Men of Bachelor Creek! Series

Caught Under the Mistletoe! (1998)
Dodging Cupid's Arrow! (1998)
Struck by Spring Fever! (1998)

Millennium 2000's Heroes Series

Once a Hero (1999)
Always a Hero (1999)

Smooth Operators Series

 The Charmer (2010)
 The Drifter (2010)
 The Sexy Devil (2010)

Heat Series 

 Hot and Bothered (2004)
 Warm and Willing (2005)

Mighty Quinns Series

Multi-Author Series

Secret Fantasies Series Multi-Author 

 7. Never Love a Cowboy (1995)

Bachelors Arms Series 

 Bachelor Husband (1995)
 The Strong Silent Type (1995)
 A Happily Unmarried Man (1996)

For Her Eyes Only Series Multi Author

 3. The Pirate (1996)
 10. A Body to Die For (1998)

Hero for Hire Series 

 3. A Body to Die for (1998)

Weddings By Dewilde Series Multi-Author 

3. Dressed To Thrill (1996)
8.Terms of Surrender (1996)

Wrong Bed Series Multi-Author 

 10. Not in My Bed! (1999)
 46. Your Bed Or Mine? (2008)
 58. Not Just Friends (2012)
 66. Compromising Positions (2016)

Personal Touch Series Multi-Author 

 4. Mr. Right Now (2001)

Trueblood Dynasty Series Multi-Author

 8. Daddy Wanted (2001)

Cooper's Corner Series Multi-Author

 14. My Christmas Cowboy (2002)

Forrester Square Series Multi-Author

 3. All She Needed (2003)

Million Dollar Secret Series Multi-Author 

 4. For Lust or Money (2007)

Lust in Translation Series Multi-Author 

 2. Doing Ireland! (2007)

Forbidden Fantasies Series Multi-Author 

 9. Incognito (2008)
 24. Into the Night (2010)

24 Hours: Lost Series Multi-Author 

 1. Who Needs Mistletoe? (2008)

Uniformly Hot! Series Multi-Author 

 57. Seducing the Marine (2014)

Anthologies and collections

References and resources

Kate Hoffmann at eHarlequin

External links
Kate Hoffmann at Fantastic Fiction

American romantic fiction writers
Year of birth missing (living people)
Living people
Novelists from Wisconsin
20th-century American novelists
21st-century American novelists
20th-century American women writers
21st-century American women writers
Women romantic fiction writers
American women novelists